Olios lamarcki, is a species of spider of the genus Olios. It is found in Madagascar to  Sri Lanka and India. The subspecies O. lamarcki taprobanicus is endemic to Sri Lanka.

See also
 List of Sparassidae species

References

Spiders described in 1806
Sparassidae
Endemic fauna of Sri Lanka
Spiders of Asia